Christopher Blake (born Peter Ronald Gray, 23 August 1949 – 11 December 2004) was an English actor and screenwriter. He is perhaps best remembered for starring in the British sitcoms Mixed Blessings (1978–80) and That's My Boy (1981–86).

Early life
He was born Peter Ronald Gray on 23 August 1949, the eldest of three boys, in Chingford, London, England. His father, Charles (known as Harry), was a plasterer and his mother, Elizabeth, a dressmaker and housewife. They went on to have two more sons. The family emigrated to Australia in the late 1950s but returned in 1966 and he attended the Fitzherbert Secondary Modern School, Brighton, Sussex. He then trained at the Central School of Speech and Drama and changed his name to Christopher Blake, because there was another Peter Gray registered with the actors' union, Equity. He chose the surname Blake from the telephone directory.

Career
Blake first came to the attention of television audiences in 1972 when he was cast as Gilbert Blythe in the 1972 BBC adaptation of Anne of Green Gables. He would later reprise the role in 1975 in Anne of Avonlea. Blake later had roles in the LWT serial Love for Lydia (1977), and then a starring role in the ITV sitcom Mixed Blessings (1978–80) for which he also sang the theme tune. Although Blake remained busy as an actor in various stage and television roles, his next truly successful venture was the ITV sitcom That's My Boy (1981–86) in which he played Robert Price, a middle-class doctor who hires a live-in housekeeper (played by Mollie Sugden) who turns out to be his biological mother. After That's My Boy, Blake continued in character parts in episodic television, but never managed to land the more prominent roles that he had enjoyed earlier in his career. In 2000, he guest-starred in the Doctor Who audio adventure The Mutant Phase which featured the Daleks.

In later years Christopher Blake turned to screenwriting, writing several episodes of Channel 5's short-lived soap Family Affairs. He wrote two episodes ("Dancing in the Dark" and "Endangered Species") of the ITV crime serial A Touch of Frost with his writing partner Tony Charles.

On the 26 February 1970 edition of Top of the Pops, Blake is seen as an audience member dancing to a Dave Clark Five performance of Everybody Get Together, the official video of the song shot with members of his acting school class.

Personal life
He was married twice and had three children from his first marriage; two daughters and a son. A talented all-round cricketer since his youth in Australia, he played the game throughout his life, including for The Lord's Taverners and William Franklyn's team, the Sargentmen, which raised money for the Malcolm Sargent Cancer Fund for Children. One of his other great passions was supporting Arsenal F.C. and he dropped references to Arsenal into scripts whenever the opportunity arose.

Illness and death
In early 2004 after an aggressive and rare form of Non-Hodgkin lymphoma was diagnosed, Blake received treatment at the Royal Marsden Hospital in Surrey. He died on 11 December 2004 in London, England, aged 55. He is buried at the East London Cemetery and Crematorium.

Television credits
 Casualty .... Alan / ... (2 episodes, 1990, 2001)
 Doctors  .... Dan Armstrong (1 episode, 2001)
 Birds of a Feather  .... David Kane (1 episode, 1997)
 Down to Earth  (1995) TV Series .... Chris Fairfax (7 episodes)
 To Be the Best  (1992) (TV) .... Sandy
 So Haunt Me (1992) .... Chris Longford (1 episode, 1992)
 Brookside  TV Series .... Tim Derby (1991)
 Young Charlie Chaplin (1989) .... Asylum Doctor (2 episodes, 1989)
 That's My Boy (1981–1986) TV Series .... Dr. Robert Price (37 episodes)
 Love's Labour's Lost (1985) (TV) .... Longaville
 Alexa (1982) TV Series .... Paul
 Tales of the Unexpected  .... Israeli Officer (1 episode, 1981)
 The Mill on the Floss (1979) TV Miniseries .... Tom Tulliver
 The Lost Boys  (1978) TV Series .... George
 Mixed Blessings  (1978–80) TV Series .... Thomas Simpson (22 episodes)
 A Ghost Story For Christmas: Stigma  (1977) (TV) .... Richard
 Love For Lydia (1977) TV Series .... Richardson
 Anne of Avonlea (1975) TV Series .... Gilbert Blythe
 Warship .... Sg. Lt. Newcombe (1 episode, 1974)
 Death or Glory Boy  (1974) (TV) .... David Parker
 Anne of Green Gables (1972) TV Series .... Gilbert Blythe

Film credits
 Child 2 Man  (2000) .... Dabdu's Sidekick
 La Passione  (1996) .... John MacIlroy
To be the best (1990) .... Sandy
 Aces High  (1976) .... Lieutenant Roberts
 Hennessy  (1975) .... Young Soldier
 Because of the Cats  (1973) .... Frank Kieft

References

External links

1949 births
2004 deaths
English male television actors
Deaths from cancer in England
People from Chingford
Male actors from London
Alumni of the Royal Central School of Speech and Drama
Deaths from non-Hodgkin lymphoma
English male screenwriters
20th-century English screenwriters
20th-century English male writers